Paraphlomis is a genus of flowering plants in the mint family, Lamiaceae, first described in 1901. It is native to China, Himalayas, and Southeast Asia.

Species 
 Paraphlomis albida Hand.-Mazz. - Fujian, Guangdong, Guangxi, Hunan, Jiangxi, Taiwan
 Paraphlomis albiflora (Hemsl.) Hand.-Mazz. - Hubei, Sichuan, Vietnam
 Paraphlomis albotomentosa C.Y.Wu - Hunan
 Paraphlomis brevifolia C.Y.Wu & H.W.Li - Guangxi
 Paraphlomis foliata (Dunn) C.Y.Wu & H.W.Li - Anhui, Fujian, Guangdong, Jiangxi
 Paraphlomis formosana (Hayata) T.H.Hsieh & T.C.Huang - southern China including Taiwan
 Paraphlomis hirsutissima C.Y.Wu - Yunnan
 Paraphlomis hispida C.Y.Wu, Bangladesh - Yunnan, Guangxi, Vietnam
 Paraphlomis intermedia C.Y.Wu & H.W.Li - Anhui, Zhejiang
 Paraphlomis javanica (Blume) Prain - China, Himalayas, Indochina, Borneo, Java, Sumatra, Philippines
 Paraphlomis kwangtungensis C.Y.Wu & H.W.Li - Guangdong
 Paraphlomis lanceolata Hand.-Mazz. - Guangdong, Guangxi, Hunan, Jiangxi
 Paraphlomis lancidentata Y.Z.Sun - Zhejiang, Vietnam
 Paraphlomis membranacea C.Y.Wu & H.W.Li - Yunnan, Vietnam
 Paraphlomis nana Y.Chen - Chongqing, China
 Paraphlomis oblongifolia (Blume) Prain - Java, Sumatra, Sulawesi
 Paraphlomis parviflora C.Y.Wu & H.W.Li - Taiwan
 Paraphlomis patentisetulosa C.Y.Wu - Guangdong
 Paraphlomis paucisetosa C.Y.Wu - Guangxi
 Paraphlomis reflexa C.Y.Wu & H.W.Li - Jiangxi
 Paraphlomis seticalyx C.Y.Wu - Guangxi
 Paraphlomis setulosa C.Y.Wu & H.W.Li - Anhui, Jiangxi
 Paraphlomis shunchangensis Z.Y.Li & M.S.Li - southeastern China
 Paraphlomis subcoriacea C.Y.Wu - Guangxi, Guangdong
 Paraphlomis tomentosocapitata Yamam. - Taiwan

References

Lamiaceae
Lamiaceae genera